A slosh baffle is a device used to dampen the adverse effects of liquid slosh in a tank. Slosh baffles have been implemented in a variety of applications including tanker trucks, and liquid rockets, although any moving tank containing liquid may employ them.

Baffle rings

Baffle rings are rigid rings placed within the inside of a tank to retard the flow of liquid between sections. The location and orifice size of the rings yield varying performance for a given application.

References

Fluid dynamics